The 2006 season was Santos Futebol Clube's ninety-fourth season in existence and the club's forty-seventh consecutive season in the top flight of Brazilian football.

This season, Santos announced the return of the manager Vanderlei Luxemburgo, who had left the club in the last season and failed at Real Madrid.
On 9 April 2006, Santos won the Campeonato Paulista for sixteenth time in history, by beating Portuguesa 2–0 in the last match.
On 31 August, they signed Brazilian midfielder Zé Roberto who was free agent since he left FC Bayern Munich, until June 2007.
In the Campeonato Brasileiro, Santos ended in the 4th place, securing a place in the 2007 Copa Libertadores. In the Copa do Brasil, Santos were knocked out by Ipatinga in the quarter-finals. Santos also competed in the Copa Sudamericana, being eliminated in the round of 16 after a 1–3 loss on aggregate to San Lorenzo.

Players

Squad

Source:

Appearances and goals

|-
!colspan=15 style="background: #F8F8FF" align=center| Players who left the club during the season
|-

Transfers

In

Out

Coaching staff

Competitions

Overall summary

Detailed overall summary

Campeonato Brasileiro

League table

Results summary

Results by round

Matches

Campeonato Paulista

League table

Results summary

Matches

Copa do Brasil

First round

Second round

Round of 16

Quarter-finals

Copa Sudamericana

Second round

Round of 16

References

2006
Brazilian football clubs 2006 season